As of 2019, the province of Valencia in the Valencian Country, Spain, is composed of 266 municipalities.

See also
Geography of Spain
List of cities in Spain

References
Place names and populations are taken from the Instituto Nacional de Estadística (INE).

 
Valencia